James Savin Foster (born 15 April 1980) is an English cricket coach and former cricketer. A wicket-keeper who played seven Tests and 11 One Day Internationals in 2001–02 and 2002–03.

Education
He was educated at Forest School, Walthamstow and Durham University (Collingwood College), where he completed the Sport in the Community course. In 2001, and still an undergraduate, he was called up for an England winter tour.

Playing style
Foster, who is known by the Essex fans as Fozzy, is often regarded as the best wicket keeper in the game. In July 2011, Alec Stewart described him as the best pure wicket-keeper in the world. This is a fact that is underlined by his ability to stand up to the stumps to many quick bowlers with consistency and excellence, and for his athleticism standing back. However, he has been overlooked by England selectors as a possible result of perceived mediocre batting, with Matt Prior, Steven Davies and Jos Buttler being preferred. Foster's batting is reliant on cuts, pulls and sweeps. In all forms of cricket, Foster uses the reverse sweep effectively. Foster usually bats at seven for Essex in all forms. He once hit 5 sixes off of the first five balls of a Scott Borthwick over vs Durham in a Pro40, but missed out on the elusive sixth when Borthwick bowled a leg-side wide.

Playing career

In county cricket, Foster has played for Essex since his County Championship debut in 2000 and in 2009 Season was selected as vice captain. He made his maiden first-class hundred against Worcestershire in 2001, but two broken bones ruined his 2002 season and though 2003 was a better year there was little hint of the startling summer he was to enjoy with the bat in 2004. That season he hit four more centuries, including 212 against Leicestershire as Essex made 708/9 declared. He also passed 1,000 runs for the season for the first time, averaging 51.85, and claimed 51 victims. In the 2006 season, he averaged 42.41 in the Liverpool Victoria County Championship and showed good form with the gloves and bat in one day cricket also.

Foster was the recipient of the NBC Denis Compton Award in 2001.

In the winter of 2007–2008, Foster played for England Lions team for their tour to India, after being called up following an injury to Worcestershire's Steven Davies.

Good form with both the gloves and the bat in recent seasons kept Foster in the selectors minds' for a possible recall to the England setup, demonstrated by his selection for the MCC season opener against Sussex in 2008.  This was realised when he was picked as the only regular wicket-keeper in England's 30-man squad for the 2009 ICC World Twenty20. Debate continued in the run up to the 2009 Ashes series whether Foster should be selected as the Test wicketkeeper for England.

Foster played for England in the 2009 ICC World Twenty20, receiving high praise for his sharp keeping and stumpings of Yuvraj Singh and Dwayne Bravo.  However, due to the preference of selectors for wicketkeepers who can bat fluently, Matt Prior remained the first-choice for England, and these five appearances were the total of his T20I appearances.

Foster was made county captain of Essex in June 2010 for all forms of the game, when Mark Pettini stepped down due to poor form with the bat. In 2011, Foster was given a beneficiary by Essex, and this included many events such as a Twenty20 match named "Fozzy's Big Bash". This match featured the Essex 1st XI vs an All Star XI, which included leading Test wicket-taker Muttiah Muralitharan and former England all-rounder Andrew Flintoff among others. He was replaced as captain in December 2015. His continued form, particularly behind the stumps, was one of the factors that led to two promising wicket-keeper batsmen, Adam Wheater and Ben Foakes to leave the county to further develop their careers. In 2018 he shared keeping duties with Wheater who had returned from Hampshire, and then Foster retired at the end of the season after hearing that Essex would not be renewing his contract.

James Foster has been known to display a fiery temperament. This was demonstrated in a televised T20 game vs Surrey County Cricket Club in 2011 at The Oval. Foster was the recipient of a waist-high full toss from Zander de Bruyn, which Foster was caught out from. A heated argument with the umpires then followed. Foster was subsequently fined an undisclosed amount by Essex County Cricket Club and also given a two match ban by the ECB.

Coaching career
Foster after retiring from cricket, was appointed as the T20 batting consultant for Glamorgan for 2019 t20 Blast.
He was appointed as the head coach of Khulna Tigers, for 2019-20 season, a franchise of Bangladesh Premier League.
Also he is appointed as fielding coach of Kolkata Knight Riders for IPL 2020 season., in 2022 he was appointed as the head coach of Peshawar Zalmi replacing Daren Sammy few days before the 2022 Pakistan Super League, who was unable to perform his duties due to personal reasons. In November 2022, he was named as the assistant coach for Kolkata Knight Riders.

References

External links

English cricketers
England Test cricketers
England One Day International cricketers
England Twenty20 International cricketers
Essex cricketers
Essex cricket captains
Durham MCCU cricketers
Northern Districts cricketers
1980 births
Living people
People educated at Forest School, Walthamstow
Marylebone Cricket Club cricketers
British Universities cricketers
Alumni of Collingwood College, Durham
Bangladesh Premier League coaches
English cricket coaches
Pakistan Super League coaches
Wicket-keepers